Nancy Tembo is a Malawian politician and serves as Minister of Foreign Affairs in the Malawi Government  since 2022. She is also a Member of Parliament (MP) representing Lilongwe City South West constituency in the National Assembly of the Republic of Malawi.

She ran as an independent candidate after a bungled 2018 Malawi Congress Party (MCP) primary election and went on to secure a landslide victory in the 2019 Malawian general election. 

She was the voice of the MCP (then the main opposition party) during the Bingu wa Mutharika Presidency (2009-2012). She was detained and badly beaten along with protest leaders such as Billy Mayaya and Undule Mwakasungula during the infamous Protests on July 20, 2011 where 22 people were killed by security forces. 

During her first term as Member of Parliament (2004-2009), Tembo was the shadow Minister of Education, chair of the African Parliamentarians Network Against Corruption (APNAC)-Malawi, and served on the Public Accounts Committee and Parliamentary Committee on Health (where she chaired the Parliamentary Sub-Committee on Reproduction).

During her second term as MP, she served on the Commonwealth Parliamentary Association (CPA) and Legal Affairs Committee.

In 2019, whilst in parliament, Tembo exposed a dubious and unprocedural 'sale' of a public school land (Livimbo Primary School) in her constituency to private commercial interests. By then, the new owners had already constructed industrial warehouses on the school grounds. 

She took the Ministry of Lands officials to task demanding an explanation. The warehouses were eventually demolished by the state. The local constituency development committee then built a brick wall to secure the school's land from further invasion. Had the school been demolished, hundreds of vulnerable children would have been left without access to basic education.

Early life and education 

Nancy Tembo was born in 1959, in Mangochi, Malawi from a nurse Monica Msosa (née Minofu) and a clinical officer, late Noel Golden Grey Msosa. Her parents were both local civil servants working in various Malawian district hospitals including Thyolo, Nsanje, Machinga, Mangochi amongst others.

She hails from Malindi, Malawi, a village in Mangochi District on the southern shores of Lake Malawi.

She attended St Mary’s Secondary School, Zomba and later enrolled at Chancellor College of the University of Malawi.

Her husband is Morgan Tembo who was the Chief Financial Officer (CFO) at Limbe Leaf Group (part of the Universal Corporation -  a global agribusiness conglomerate). Together they have six children. Her husband's uncle is the veteran politician John Tembo and hence is a cousin to de facto former first lady Cecilia Tamanda Kadzamira.

Tembo holds a masters degree from Leeds Beckett University in the United Kingdom.

Political career 

Tembo began her political career when she ran for MP in the 2004 Malawian general election and won the Lilongwe City South West Constituency seat. During this term she also served as Publicity Secretary and National Spokesperson for then main opposition Malawi Congress Party. In the 2009 general election she failed to win a second term, losing to a ruling Democratic Progressive Party (DPP) party candidate. 

In 2012 she was appointed a Commissioner for the Malawi Electoral Commission (MEC) and served until 2016. During the controversial 2014 general elections, she led an MEC Commissioner Revolt seeking electoral justice and demanding a recount of votes before a winner was announced. The recount failed based on a legal technicality and former President Peter Mutharika was announced the winner much to the disgruntlement of many.

In 2018, she ran in the MCP primary elections in her former constituency. On the day of the primaries she was announced the winner and her rival Rhino Chiphiko and his supporters quietly left the venue, seemingly in defeat, through the back gate. Later in the day, media reports began announcing Chiphiko as the winner and the MCP also confirmed him as the primary election winner and the party candidate for the 2019 Malawi parliamentally elections. This dispute led to Hon. Tembo running on an independent ticket where she won with a landslide of 25,000+ votes. She beat all candidates from DPP and UTM including her MCP rival, Chiphiko, who came in third position.

After her victory, she engaged herself in the fight for electoral justice seeking the nullification of the 2019 presidential elections.  She joined colleagues in the Tonse Alliance grouping of nine political parties, led by Lazarus Chakwera. Their efforts led to the birth of the 3rd Republic and election of Chakwera as the sixth President of Malawi.

She was appointed as Minister of Natural Resources and Climate Change in President Chakwera's inaugural cabinet and sworn in on 10 July 2020. Since then, Tembo has been a tireless environmental crusader advocating for tree planting and environmental restoration in Malawi by partnering with local and international development partners including the United Nations, IUCN, Cleaner Cooking Coalition, Rotary International, amongst many others. Her ambition is to replace charcoal burning (a leading cause of deforestation and environmental degradation in rural Malawi) with cleaner, more sustainable cooking methods for the majority of Malawians with an ultimate aim of achieving a clean and green Malawi again in our lifetime. 

In August 2021, as Malawi became the chair of the Southern Africa Development Community (SADC), and she assumed the leadership of the SADC Cluster on Environment, Natural Resources, and Tourism. Later, as Minister of Foreign Affairs, she served as Chair of the SADC Council of Ministers.

In November 2021, she represented her native Malawi at the United Nations COP26 Climate Change Conference in Glasgow, Scotland after agreeing collaboration and support from the UK government.

Tembo was appointed Minister of Foreign Affairs of Malawi in January 2022.

References

1959 births
Living people
21st-century Malawian politicians
21st-century women politicians
Female foreign ministers
Foreign Ministers of Malawi
Malawi Congress Party politicians
Malawian women in politics
Members of the National Assembly (Malawi)
People from Mangochi District